Australia has approximately 11,500 km2 of mangroves, primarily on the northern and eastern coasts of the continent. Areas where mangroves occur include the intertidal zone of tropical, subtropical and protected temperate coastal rivers, estuaries, bays and marine shorelines. Less than 1% of Australia's total forest area is mangrove forest.

Although mangroves are typically found in tropical and subtropical tidal areas, there are occurrences as far south as Millers Landing in Wilsons Promontory, Victoria (38°54′S), Barker Inlet in Adelaide, South Australia and Leschenault Inlet (Koombana Park), near Bunbury, Western Australia.

Nearly half of Australia's mangrove forests are found in Queensland (44% of Australia's total), followed by the Northern Territory (37%) and Western Australia (17%).

In Western Australia, populations of mangroves are scattered down the coast; the population of the Abrolhos Islands is 300 kilometres south of the nearest population of Shark Bay, and the population at Bunbury is even further south than this (500 km). The Bunbury colonisation may have occurred relatively recently, perhaps only several thousand years ago, with propagules transferred by the Leeuwin Current. The most inland occurrence of mangroves in Australia is a stand of grey mangroves in the Mandora Marsh, some 60 km from the coast.

Flora

Australian mangrove forests comprise 45 plant species from 18 families, which is more than half the world's mangrove species. One tree species, Avicennia integra, is found only in Australia - in the Northern Territory, east of Darwin.
 
Each mangrove tree species is specific to particular latitudes and levels of tidal inundation. The greatest diversity of species is found in the far northern and north-eastern areas of Australia, and declines rapidly with increasing latitude. For example, Darwin Harbour, in the north of Australia, contains 36 mangrove tree species, while Bunbury, in the south, contains only one mangrove tree species. There are no mangroves in Tasmania.

The most widespread and common mangrove tree in Australia is the grey mangrove or white mangrove (Avicennia marina).

Mangrove forests also support several salt-tolerant plant species which are not classed as mangroves. In tropical areas, this may include the mangrove palm (Nypa fruticans), the mangrove fern (Acrostichum speciosum), and orchids which grow as epiphytes on the trunks and branches of mangrove trees. Other plants found in association with mangroves include the mangrove lily (Crinum pedunculatum).

Mangrove forests share the high intertidal zone niche with coastal or intertidal saltmarshes; plant communities dominated by salt-resistant or salt-tolerant herbs and low shrubs.

Associated fauna

Mangrove forests provide breeding nurseries for a wide range of fish and crustaceans, including many species of commercial and recreational value, for example, barramundi (Lates calcarifer), mangrove jack (Lutjanus argentimaculatus), mud crabs (Scylla serrata) and banana prawn (Penaeus merguinensis). The forests also provide a habitat for spat settlement and development of oyster species.

Many terrestrial fauna, such as insects, reptiles, frogs, birds and mammals, use mangroves for food, shelter, breeding and feeding grounds.

The rusty monitor (Varanus semiremex) shelters in the hollows of mature or dead mangrove trees in north-eastern Queensland. The mangrove snake (Fordonia leucobalia) and estuarine crocodile (Crocodylus porosus) are found in mangrove forests in the north.

The lesser noddy (Anous tenuirostris melanops) builds a platform nest of leaves in mangrove trees. This bird is listed as vulnerable under Australia's Environment Protection and Biodiversity Conservation Act 1999.

Mangrove forests provide habitat for many small insectivorous birds, including the varied honeyeater, mangrove honeyeater, rufous-banded honeyeater, mangrove robin, lemon-bellied flycatcher, buff-sided robin, little shrike-thrush grey whistler, white-breasted whistler, northern fantail, mangrove grey fantail, Arafura fantail, broad-billed flycatcher, shining flycatcher, spectacled monarch, white-eared monarch and yellow white-eye. Other bird species observed to frequent mangrove forests are the rose-crowned fruit-dove, little bronze-cuckoo, Papuan frogmouth, azure kingfisher, little kingfisher, forest kingfisher, Torresian kingfisher, sacred kingfisher and fawn-breasted bowerbird.

Mangrove forests are sometimes used as nursery areas by flying foxes in the Darwin Harbour and other areas of Australia. Several species, including the little red flying fox, are dependent on mangrove pollen as food.

Economic values

Mangroves protect coastal areas from erosion, storm surge, and tsunamis. The massive root systems of mangroves are efficient at dissipating wave energy. Mangroves retard the tidal movement of water, allowing sediment to be deposited as the tide comes in, and leaving all except fine particles when the tide ebbs. Mangroves therefore build their own environment.

The commercial and recreational fishing industries are prime beneficiaries of mangrove forests, which provide breeding and feeding grounds for fish and prawns. About 75% of the fish and prawns caught for commercial and recreational purposes in Queensland spend at least part of their lifecycles in mangroves.

In some coastal communities, boardwalks and bird-viewing areas in mangrove forests provide attractions for the eco-tourism industry, for example, at Boondall Wetlands.

Threats

Threats to mangrove ecosystems include;
 coastal modifications such as reclaiming land (e.g. for building canal estates and marinas);
 erosion of shorelines in coastal lakes and estuaries;
 elevated levels of nutrients and sediments from land clearing, overgrazing and cropping;
 increased levels of heavy metals such as copper, lead, cadmium, zinc and mercury, and tributyl tin (TBT) from anti-fouling paints;
 marine oil pollution from sewage systems and drains, which is estimated at 16,000 tonnes a year over the whole of Australia;
 accidental spills during re-fuelling of vessels in ports.

Removal of mangrove forests can lead to erosion of the shoreline, exposure of acid sulphate soils, shallowing of estuaries and waterways, and a reduction in water quality.

These threats can deplete the populations of fish, prawns, crabs and other sea life that use mangroves as breeding and feeding grounds, which would then impact on commercial and recreational fishing.

Protection and preservation

About one third of the total area of mangrove forest in Australia is privately owned, including Indigenous reserves. Approximately 18% of Australia's mangrove forest areas fall under the protection of National Parks and other reserves.

Mangroves are protected in Queensland under the Fisheries Act 1994, and in Western Australia under the Wildlife Conservation Act 1950.

As the benefits of mangroves become more widely known, grassroots efforts to protect mangroves are becoming more common. Boardwalks provide opportunities for educating people about the ecological and economic importance of mangroves.

See also
 Changes in global mangrove distributions
 Ecological values of mangroves

References

External links 

 Department of Agriculture, Fisheries and Forestry – Australian Forest Profiles
 Mangrove Watch Australia
 Fisheries Western Australia – Mangroves Fact Sheet
 Northern Territory Department of Infrastructure, Planning and Environment – Mangroves in the Northern Territory, Report Number 25/2003D (2003)
 Australian Institute of Marine Science – Field Guide to the Mangroves of Queensland (1993)
 Murdoch University – The Western Australian Mangrove Page

Mangrove ecoregions
Mangrove
Mangrove
Central Indo-Pacific